Agalmyla elegans is a species of plants in the family Gesneriaceae. It is found in Papua New Guinea.

References

External links 
 Agalmyla elegans at The Plant List
 Agalmyla elegans at Tropicos
 Agalmyla elegans at GBIF

Plants described in 2002
Didymocarpoideae
Flora of Papua New Guinea